Club Voleibol Haro, also known as Haro Rioja Voley is a Spanish volleyball club from Haro in La Rioja. Founded in 1996, it is best known for its women's team, which has played in the Superliga since 2008. In 2012, it won the national cup and supercup, and it was the championship's runner-up.

Titles
Superliga Femenina (1)
2012–13
Copa de la Reina (2)
2012, 2013
Supercopa (1)
2012

Season to season

2013–14 season squad

References

External links
Official website
RFEVB profile

Sports teams in La Rioja (Spain)
Spanish volleyball clubs
Volleyball clubs established in 1996